Domenico Angelo (1717 Leghorn, Italy – 1802, Twickenham, England), was an Italian sword and fencing master, also known as Angelo Domenico Malevolti Tremamondo. The son of a merchant, he was the founder of the Angelo Family of fencers. He has been praised as "the first to emphasize fencing as a means of developing health, poise, and grace. As a result of his insight and influence, fencing changed from an art of war to a sport."

Travels
He moved to Paris at the age of 27, with an eye to taking over the family business, but instead gained fencing skills under a master there, Teillagory. He also had an affair with the English actress Peg Woffington, and went with her to London and Dublin. However, the affair cooled and on 5 February 1755 he instead married the 17-year-old Elizabeth Johnson (1738–1805), with whom he had several children.

Fencing tuition
In England, Angelo gained the patronage of Henry Herbert, 10th Earl of Pembroke, and three years later of the dowager Princess of Wales, who appointed him as riding and fencing master to George, Prince of Wales, and his brother Edward, duke of York. By then he had established Angelo's School of Arms in Carlisle House, Soho, London.

In 1763 he bought Carlisle House, Soho Square, where he taught the aristocracy the fashionable art of swordsmanship. One of his tenants there was the composer Johann Christian Bach, youngest son of J.S. Bach and harpsichord instructor to the Queen.

With the help of artist Gwyn Delin, he had a fencing instruction book, L'École des armes'', published in England in 1763, with 25 engraved plates demonstrating classic positions from the old schools of fencing. This placed its "emphasis on fencing as a source of gentlemanly exercise rather than as a necessary preparation for duel".

In 1760, Angelo handed over his school to a son, and established himself at Eton, where his family continued to teach fencing for three more generations.

Family
By his wife Elizabeth Johnson, Angelo had at least six children:

Henry Charles William, born 5 April 1756. Also a fencing master, father of Henry Charles Angelo the Younger.
Florella Sophia, born 1759, Dame at Eton.
Anne Caroline Eliza, born 1763.
Catherine Elizabeth, born 1766, married to Mark Drury, Second Master at Harrow school, and brother of Joseph Drury, Headmaster of Harrow. She was mother to William James Joseph Drury.
Elizabeth Tremamondo, born 1768.
George Xavier Tremamondo, born 1773.

There was perhaps also a son called Michael Angelo.

Death
He died at his daughter Florella's house at Twickenham on 11 July 1802.

Legacy
The play "Tremamondo - The Angel of Fencing", written by Alberto Bona and directed by Giampaolo Zennaro, was staged at the Teatro Carlo Goldoni, in Domenico Angelo's native town of Leghorn.

References

External links
Descendants of Angelo Domenico Tremamondo
Fencers of Fame and Fiction, Margaret Odrowaz-Sypniewski, B.F.A.
Swynnerton, C. in Barron, O. (ed) The Ancestor, Number 8 1904 (pp 1-73)

1717 births
1802 deaths
Italian male fencers
People from Livorno
Domenico